Addendum (from latin addendum, meaning (that which) must be added) is an Austrian journalistic research platform, funded by billionaire Dietrich Mateschitz through the non-profit organisation Quo Vadis Veritas. The release of its first research findings occurred on 25 September 2017. Its managing directors are Michael Fleischhacker (who also serves as the publisher) and Niko Alm.

See also 
 Media in Austria
 Red Bull GmbH
 List of newspapers in Austria
 Investigative journalism

References 

Investigative journalism